The Tunka Goltsy is a mountain range in Buryatia, Far Eastern Federal District, Russia.

Geography
Its length is 160 km, it is the easternmost part of the Eastern Sayan. 

Highest summit Strelnikov Peak (Algan Mundarga), 3157 m.

Rivers: Irkut and other tributaries of Angara River

See also
List of mountains and hills of Russia
Golets (geography)
Tunkin Depression

References

Russian

Sayan Mountains